This is a list of hospitals in Cuba.  There are no private hospitals or clinics in Cuba, as all health services are government-run.  There were 150 hospitals in Cuba, as of 2019.

Havana 

Active and notable hospitals in Havana, capital of Cuba, are listed below.  The hospital name in English and Spanish and date first opened are included.

Other cities 

Active and notable hospitals in other cities include:

Defunct hospitals 

 Hospital de San Lázaro, Havana (Royal Hospital of San Lázaro), Barrio de San Lázaro, 1781-1916
 St. Ambrose Hospital, 1568-1899
 Hospital of San Felipe and Santiago (San Juan de Dios)
 Belemitas Hospital
 Hospice of San Isidro

Notes

See also 

 Healthcare in Cuba
 List of medical schools in the Caribbean#Cuba

References

 
Hospitals
C
Cuba